Henri Cogan (13 September 1914 in Paris – 23 September 2003 in Boulogne-Billancourt) was a French actor and stuntman.

Biography
Before Henri Cogan became a fight choreographer for European action films he proved his expertise in hand-to-hand combat publicly by fighting as a professional wrestler. As a wrestler he once fought Lino Ventura and later he introduced him to Georges Lautner. Henri Cogan appeared in French, German and English films.

Selected filmography

1947: Un flic (by Maurice de Canonge) - Un homme de Zattore
1953: La môme vert-de-gris (by Bernard Borderie) - Un copain de l'électricien (uncredited)
1954: Yours Truly, Blake (by Bernard Borderie) - Sam
1955: Les Chiffonniers d'Emmaüs (by Robert Darène) - Le bagarreur (uncredited)
1955:  (by John Berry) - (uncredited)
1955:  (by John Berry)
1956: Goubbiah, mon amour (by Robert Darène) - The Scarface
1956: The Whole Town Accuses (by Claude Boissol) - Un gangster
1956:  (by Raoul André)
1957: Burning Fuse (by Henri Decoin) - Matt
1957:  (by ) - a gambler
1957: Méfiez-vous fillettes (by Yves Allégret) - Un homme de main de Palmer (uncredited)
1957: Send a Woman When the Devil Fails (by Yves Allégret) - Alberti
1957: Une Parisienne (by Michel Boisrond) - Un bagarreur
1957: Les Truands (by Carlo Rim) - Un cow-boy au saloon (uncredited)
1957:  (by )
1958: The Amorous Corporal (by Robert Darène) - Tom Wright
1958: Peter Voss, Thief of Millions (by ) -  Otto
1959:  (by ) - Michel
1959: Bobby Dodd greift ein (by Géza von Cziffra)
1959: Paradise for Sailors (by Harald Reinl) - Matrose Joe
1960: Marche ou crève (by Georges Lautner) - Kasger
1960: Women Are Like That (by Bernard Borderie) - Zucco
1960: Jack of Spades (by Yves Allégret) - Un guardian
1960: Me faire ça à moi (by Pierre Grimblat) - Grognon
1961: The Three Musketeers (by Bernard Borderie) - Mousqueton
1961: En plein cirage (by Georges Lautner) - Un truand
1962: Lemmy pour les dames - Réglege des Bagarres
1962:  (by Bernard Borderie) - Le meunier
1962: L'Œil du monocle (by Georges Lautner) - Archiloque
1963: Tela de araña (by José Luis Monter)
1963: À toi de faire... mignonne (by Bernard Borderie) - Pierrot
1963: Les Tontons flingueurs (by Georges Lautner) - Freddy
1964: Hardi Pardaillan! (by Bernard Borderie)
1964: That Man in Istanbul (by Antonio Isasi-Isasmendi) - Cogan
1964: Angélique marquise des anges (by Bernard Borderie) - Cul-de-Bois
1964: The Gorillas (by Jean Girault) - (uncredited)
1965: Marvelous Angelique (by Bernard Borderie) - Cul-de-Bois
1965: Agent 3S3: Passport to Hell (Agente 3 S 3 passaporto per inferno) (by Sergio Sollima) - Sanz
1965: The Liquidator (by Jack Cardiff) - Yakov
1965: Manhattan Night of Murder (by Harald Philipp) - Bruce
1965: Nick Carter and Red Club (fight choreographer)
1966: Brigade antigangs (by Bernard Borderie) - Le Limousin
1967:  (by Georges Lautner) - Riton Godot
1968: Angelique and the Sultan (by Bernard Borderie) - Bolbec
1968: Le Pacha (by Georges Lautner) - Riton
1969:  (by Bernard Borderie) - Gros-Téton
1969: The Madwoman of Chaillot (by Bryan Forbes) - a waiter
1971:  (by Georges Farrel) - Le peintre
1971:  (by Michel Audiard) - Le conducteur du second engin (uncredited)
1972:  (by Georges Lautner) - Jeannot (uncredited)
1973:  (by Georges Lautner) - Maurice
1973: Hit! (by Sidney J. Furie) - Bornou
1975: Pas de problème ! (by Georges Lautner) - a killer
1976: Hippopotamours  (by Christian Fuin) - Le masseur
1984: Joyeuses Pâques (by Georges Lautner)
1987:  (by Georges Lautner) - L'homme du couple âgé (final film role)

References

External links

1914 births
2003 deaths
French male film actors
Male actors from Paris
French stunt performers